Livedelica is British progressive metal band Threshold's first live album, released in 1995. It was recorded during a show on their 1995 European Tour. It is the only Threshold release to feature drummer Jay Micciche. The album itself is out of print, but is now available as a bonus disc on the Special Edition of their 1994 album Psychedelicatessen.

Track list

 "A Tension Of Souls" - 7:30
 "Sanity's End" - 11:08
 "Innocent" - 4:40
 "Surface To Air" - 9:14
 "Paradox" - 9:02

Musicians

Glynn Morgan: vocals
Karl Groom: guitar / backing vocals
Nick Midson: guitar
Jon Jeary: bass / backing vocals
Richard West: keyboards / backing vocals
Jay Micciche: drums

Threshold (band) albums
1995 live albums